Mr. Big is the largest sized chocolate bar produced by Cadbury in Canada, hence the name. The standard bar is made of a layered vanilla wafer coated in caramel, peanuts, and rice crisps and covered in a chocolate coating. The bar is the length of two "standard"-sized bars – around 20 centimeters (8 inches) long. Additional varieties include Mr. Chew Big, Mr. Big Fudge, and Mr. Big with Maple.

Market and marketing
The bar is common in Canada, but is also available in Hungary, Poland and some areas of the United States. A Canadian advertising campaign in the 1970s included the tagline "Mr. Big: so big they call him Mister". The product launched in the U.S. in 1995, and the launch included an advertising campaign with the basketball player Shaquille O'Neal. A miniature Mr. Big chocolate bar is manufactured and marketed for the Halloween season.

Brand name
The Mr. Big brand name was originally owned by Nestlé and licensed by William Neilson (now Cadbury).  This created the situation where the trademark of one of Neilson's largest brands was owned by its largest competitor. Neilson then bought the rights to the name Mr. Big for confectionery.

Ice cream
Mr. Big was the only Cadbury chocolate bar to have an ice cream variant made by Nestlé until 2019. It was discontinued in May 2002 in the UK due to poor sales. An ice cream bar version produced by Nestlé is available in Canada, although other Cadbury ice cream products were previously made by Breyers.

References

External links
https://www.snackworks.ca/en/products/cadbury

Canadian confectionery
Mr. Big
Mr. Big
Mondelez International brands